Dear America: Letters Home from Vietnam is a 1987 American documentary film inspired by the anthology of the same title, directed by Bill Couturié. The film's narration consists of real letters written by American soldiers, which are read by actors including Robert de Niro and Martin Sheen. The footage includes film from TV news, the Department of Defense and home movies by the soldiers themselves.

Summary
Using real letters written by American soldiers (which can be read in the book along with many more) and archive footage, the film creates a highly personal experience of the Vietnam War.

Reception
Gene Siskel and Roger Ebert each gave the film strong recommendation. Ebert wrote in his review:

"This movie is so powerful precisely because it is so simple. The words are the words of the soldiers themselves, and the images are taken from their own home movies and from TV news footage of the war. There are moments here that cannot be forgotten, and most of them are due to the hard work of the filmmaker, director Bill Couturie, who has not taken just any words and any old footage, but precisely the right words to go with the images. Couturie began with an anthology of letters written home by U.S. soldiers in Vietnam. Then he screened the entire archive of TV news footage shot by NBC-TV from 1967 to 1969 - 2 million feet of film totaling 926 hours. He also gained access to footage from the Defense Department, including previously classified film of action under fire. Much of the footage in this film has never been seen publicly before, and watching it, you know why. What Couturie and his researchers have done is amazing. In many cases, they have matched up individual soldiers with their letters - we see them as we hear their words, and then we discover their fates."

Accolades
The film won the 1988 Special Jury Prize: Documentary at the Sundance Film Festival and two Emmy Awards. It was also screened out of competition at the 1988 Cannes Film Festival.

References

External links
 
 
 Review by Roger Ebert

1987 films
Documentary films about the Vietnam War
Films directed by Bill Couturié
American documentary films
Letters (message)
Peabody Award-winning broadcasts
1987 documentary films
Collage film
Primetime Emmy Award-winning broadcasts
1980s English-language films
1980s American films